Ciné Pop was a French TV channel owned by AB Groupe shown on satellite which showed exclusive films oriented to families and children.

History
In 1996, AB Group launched a bunch of five cinema channels: Action, Ciné Palace, Polar, Romance and Rire. The latter is centered on humorous cinema.

During the redesign of the cinema channels in 2002 by the group, the bouquet is called Cinébox and the channel becomes Ciné Comic. It maintains the same orientation in its programs, that is to say, humorous cinema. However, it will be suppressed in August 2004 at the same time as the cinema showcase, Ciné Box.

In 2007, 3 years after the stop of Ciné Comic, AB Group decides to re-experience the experience by creating a similar channel centered on family cinema. Initially named Ciné Pop Corn then Ciné Funilly, the channel got the name Ciné Pop.

After 10 months of broadcasting, it was abruptly suppressed to give way to new channels promised by AB Groupe.

Broadcasting
The channel was shown on the satellite packages of Bis Télévisions and AB Groupe.

References

External links
 

Mediawan Thematics
Defunct television channels in France
Television channels and stations established in 1996
Television channels and stations disestablished in 2007
1996 establishments in France
2007 disestablishments in France